The 2000 UCI Women's Road World Cup was the third edition of the UCI Women's Road World Cup. Seven rounds were contested; compared to 1999, the Trophée International and the New Zealand World Cup were dropped, while the Ladies Tour Beneden-Maas was replaced by the Rotterdam Tour. Diana Žiliūtė won the series for the second time, having won the inaugural series in 1998.

Races

Final classification

The

External links

2000 in women's road cycling
UCI Women's Road World Cup